Naree  is a 1992 Bangladeshi treatise book about feminism written by Humayun Azad. The book was considered incendiary, and was banned on 19 November 1995, by the government of Bangladesh. Five years later, though, in 2000, the ban was lifted, following a legal battle that Azad won. The High Court of Bangladesh decided that the prohibition was invalid.

Summary 
The book in Bengali is a feminist analysis of women's status and condition in civilizations created by men. This is the first comprehensive discussion in Bengali about feminism and the difficulties that Bengali women face in their daily lives. Azad is critic of acclaimed figures, notably Rabindranath Tagore and Bankim Chandra Chatterjee.

Azad has taken help from many western books to write this book, this has been mentioned in the introduction of the book by Azad himself.

Chapters

See also 
 Humayun Azad bibliography
 List of books banned by governments
 Blasphemy law in Bangladesh
 Women in Bangladesh
 Feminism in Bangladesh

References

1992 non-fiction books
1992 books
Feminist books
Books about feminism
Books by Humayun Azad
Bangladeshi non-fiction books